The British Academy Television Award for Best Entertainment Performance is an award given out by the British Academy of Film and Television Arts at their annual BAFTA Television Awards ceremony.

This category has had minor name changes:

From 1958 to 1962 it was presented as an individual award named Best Light Entertainment Artist.
From 1963 to 1965 it was awarded as Best Light Entertainment Personality
From 1967 to 1999 it was awarded as Best Light Entertainment Performance.
Since 2000  the award has been known as Best Entertainment Performance.

Prior to the 1994 ceremony, acting performances in comedy roles were included in this category. Since 1994 they have been recognised in the Best Comedy Performance category.

Winners and nominees

1950s

1960s

1970s

1980s

1990s

2000s

2010s

2020s

Performers with multiple wins and nominations

Multiple wins
The following people have been awarded the British Academy Television Award for Best Entertainment Performance multiple times:

6 wins
Graham Norton

4 wins
Ronnie Barker
Nigel Hawthorne
Eric Morecambe & Ernie Wise

3 wins
Anthony McPartlin & Declan Donnelly
Jonathan Ross

2 wins
Rowan Atkinson
Rory Bremner
Harry Hill
Richard Wilson
Victoria Wood

Multiple nominations
The following people have been nominated for the British Academy Television Award for Best Entertainment Performance multiple times:

13 nominations
Graham Norton

12 nominations
Ronnie Barker

10 nominations
Paul Merton

8 nominations
Anthony McPartlin & Declan Donnelly
Stephen Fry

7 nominations
Rowan Atkinson

5 nominations
Rory Bremner
Ronnie Corbett
Harry Hill
David Jason
Victoria Wood

4 nominations
Stanley Baxter
John Bird & John Fortune
John Cleese
Paul Eddington
Nigel Hawthorne
Barry Humphries
Arthur Lowe
Eric Morecambe & Ernie Wise
Jonathan Ross

3 nominations
Alan Carr
Judi Dench
Adam Hills
Penelope Keith
Michael McIntyre
Leonard Rossiter
Richard Wilson
Claudia Winkleman

2 nominations
Caroline Aherne
Dave Allen
Kathy Burke
Angus Deayton
Leigh Francis
Dawn French
Nicholas Lyndhurst
Lee Mack
Sarah Millican
David Mitchell
Michael Parkinson
Romesh Ranganathan
Patricia Routledge

References

Entertainment Performance